Morris "Bud" Fisher (May 4, 1890 – May 23, 1968) was an American sport shooter and United States Marine Corps shooting instructor. He competed at the 1920 and 1924 Summer Olympics and won five gold medals in 300–800 m rifle events. He ended his Olympic career in 1924, as shooting was not part of the 1928 Games, and long-distance rifle events re-appeared only at the 1948 Olympics, when he had long retired both from active competitions and military service.

Biography
In 1911 Fisher enlisted in the United States Marine Corps and later competed while on duty. Besides his Olympic medals, Fisher won six world titles and held five world records. In 1916 he was awarded the distinguished marksman badge. He retired from shooting competitions in 1934 and later coached shooters at the U.S. Marine Corps and at the Toledo police department. In 1941 he retired from military service in the rank of gunnery sergeant. He was soon recalled as a shooting instructor during World War II, in which he lost his son William, at Okinawa in 1945. Fisher retired for good in 1946, and settled first in La Jolla, California, and then in Honolulu, Hawaii, where he died in 1968. He was buried with full military honors at Fort Rosecrans National Cemetery in San Diego, California. In 2009, he was inducted into the United States Marine Corps Sports Hall of Fame. He has also been inducted into the USA Shooting Hall of fame.

Books by Fisher
 Mastering the Pistol and Revolver, New York:  Putnam's, 1940. [Riling 2314]
 Mastering the Rifle, New York:  Putnam's, 1940. [Riling 2315]

References

External links

1890 births
1968 deaths
American male sport shooters
United States Distinguished Marksman
Shooters at the 1920 Summer Olympics
Shooters at the 1924 Summer Olympics
Olympic gold medalists for the United States in shooting
United States Marines
Olympic medalists in shooting
Jewish American sportspeople
Medalists at the 1920 Summer Olympics
Medalists at the 1924 Summer Olympics
United States Marine Corps personnel of World War I
United States Marine Corps personnel of World War II
20th-century American Jews
Military personnel from Ohio
19th-century American people
20th-century American people